Ansar al-Islam in Kurdistan, simply called Ansar al-Islam, also nicknamed the Kurdish Taliban, is a Kurdish Islamist militant and separatist group. It was established in northern Iraq around the Kurdistan Region by Kurdish Islamists who were former Taliban and former Al-Qaeda members, coming back from Afghanistan, in 2001. Its motive is to establish an Islamic state around the Kurdistan region and to protect Kurdish people. It imposed strict Sharia in villages it controlled around Byara near the Iranian border. Its ideology follows a traditionalist interpretation of the Quran and Salafism.

The group was a designated terrorist organization in the United Nations, Australia, Canada, Israel, the United Kingdom, and the United States, and a known affiliate of the al-Qaeda network.

On 29 August 2014, 50 members and commanders of Ansar al-Islam announced that they were joining ISIS individually, however Ansar al-Islam continued to oppose ISIS and kept functioning independently. Abu Khattab al-Kurdi was among those who left Ansar al-Islam for ISIS, and he later became an ISIS commander. When a previously unknown Kurdish militant group using white flags appeared in Iraq in 2017, Iraqi security and intelligence officials argued that this was splinter group of Ansar al-Islam, which reportedly still had hundreds of fighters operating in the Hamrin Mountains.

Name 
Their official name is "Ansar al-Islam in Kurdistan", meaning "Supporters of Islam in Kurdistan", but they are called "Ansar al-Islam" for short.

The group received the nickname "Kurdish Taliban" because it was made up of Kurds who fought for the Taliban in Afghanistan, and for their similarity with the Taliban, including how both of them established Islamic Emirates under Sharia law, both of their fighters were Islamist but had some nationalism (Taliban with Pashtun, Ansar with Kurdish), and both of them harshly persecuted non-Muslims.

History

Formation
Ansar al-Islam seeks to establish an "Islamic state" under Sharia law, as well as to obtain and preserve the "legitimate rights" of the Kurds.

Ansar al-Islam was formed in September 2001 from a merger of Jund al-Islam (not the Egyptian Jund al-Islam), led by Abu Abdullah al-Shafi'i, and a splinter group from the Kurdistan Islamic Movement led by Mullah Krekar. Krekar became the leader of the merged Ansar al-Islam, which opposed an agreement made between IMK and the dominant Kurdish group in the area, Patriotic Union of Kurdistan (PUK). The group later made allegiance to al-Qaeda and allegedly received direct funds from the terror network.

Ansar al-Islam initially comprised approximately 300 men, many of them Kurdish veterans of Jihad in the Soviet–Afghan War.

The two IMK splinter groups that formed Jund al Islam on 1 September 2001, had some early battlefield successes in the same month when it killed 42 PUK-Peshmerga fighters in an ambush, which led to them drawing in more IMK leaders in their ranks, on 10 December 2001, the group became known as AAI (Ansar al-Islam).

During the Islamic Emirate of Byara near the Iranian border, there were allegations of logistical support from "powerful factions in Iran".

The roots of Ansar al-Islam can be traced to the mid-1990s. The group consists of various Islamist factions that splintered from the Islamic Movement of Kurdistan (IMK). In 2001, shortly before the 9/11 attacks, leaders of several Kurdish Islamist factions visited the al-Qa'ida leadership in Afghanistan planning to create a base for al-Qa'ida in northern Iraq. A document found in Kabul stated the group's objective which was to "expel those Jews and Christians from Kurdistan and join the way of jihad, and rule every piece of land with Islamic Sharia law." This was also confirmed by the Los Angeles Times, based upon interviews with an Ansar prisoner, which stated that in October 2000, Kurdish Islamist leaders sent jihadists to Osama bin Laden's camps, and they received the message from bin Laden that all Kurdish Islamist groups should unite into a single group.

Period up to the Iraq War
Upon its founding, Ansar al-Islam declared a holy war on all secular political parties in Iraqi Kurdistan. Throughout 2002, AAI carried out attacks on those Kurdish groups and targeted assassinations, particularly on high-level PUK members, as well as engaging in battles and skirmishes with the PUK. The attacks allowed the AAI to control their own area in northeast Iraq, called the Islamic Emirate of Byara, under its spiritual founder and leader Mullah Krekar. Sharia Law was implemented, enforcing it through the bombing of businesses it deemed in-Islamic, acid attacks on women it deemed immodest and beheading of those it deemed apostates.

In the Islamic Emirate of Byara, villages were subjected to harsh Sharia law; musical instruments were destroyed and singing was forbidden, although nasheeds were allowed, and Ansar al-Islam released many nasheeds in the Kurdish language. Girls were not allowed education, and the only school for girls in the area was destroyed, and all pictures of women removed from advertisement labels. Sufi shrines were desecrated and the Yarsan religious minority were forced to convert to Islam, flee, or be killed. Former prisoners of the group also claim that Ansar al-Islam routinely used torture and severe beatings when interrogating prisoners. Beheading of prisoners had also been reported.

In late 2001 and early 2002, AAI received an inflow of foreign jihadist volunteers fleeing Afghanistan following the 2001 invasion of Afghanistan. AAI took advantage of the larger numbers and used them for better defense from PUK. One of the foreign jihadists was Abu Musab al-Zarqawi, who stayed with them shortly.

Prior to the US 2003 invasion of Iraq, paramilitary teams from the Special Activities Division (SAD) and the Army's 10th Special Forces Group entered Iraq and cooperated with PUK -Peshmerga to attack Ansar al-Islam. Together they launched Operation Viking Hammer in March 2003 which dealt a huge blow to the terrorist group which resulted in the deaths of a substantial number of terrorists and the uncovering of a potential chemical weapons facility at Sargat, as well as the end of the Islamic Emirate of Byara. After about fifteen reporters (including NY Times, LA Times, ABC, and BBC) visited Sargat, they searched another location that was supposed to be a chemical weapons factory, which Colin Powell spoke about, they saw nothing but a studio which AAI planned to turn to a TV and radio station. They claimed that the studio was going to be used to make Ansar al-Islam propaganda.

Iraq War

In 2003, many Kurdish youths of Ansar al-Islam were killed by Iraqi Arab members of Al-Qaeda in Iraq in Baghdad due to fears that Kurds were taking over the Jihad movement in Iraq.

In September 2003, some members of Ansar al-Islam, who had fled to Iran after the 2003 joint Iraqi-US operation against them, announced their allegiance to a new group called Jamaat Ansar al-Sunna, which was mostly Arab and was dedicated to expelling U.S. forces from Iraq. Ansar al-Sunna became a prominent insurgent group active in the so-called Sunni Triangle, carrying out kidnappings, suicide bombings, and guerilla attacks.

In November or December 2007 the Ansar al-Sunna group acknowledged that it was an offshoot of Ansar al-Islam, and briefly went to using that name, before changing it to Ansar Al Ahlu Sunna.

Iraqi Insurgency (post-U.S. withdrawal)
Ansar al-Islam remained active after the withdrawal of U.S. troops from Iraq of 2011, taking part in the insurgency against Iraq's central government. The group has claimed attacks against Iraqi security forces, particularly around Mosul and Kirkuk.

Syrian Civil War
Ansar al-Islam has established a presence in Syria to take part in the Syrian Civil War, initially under the name of "Ansar al-Sham", later under its own name. The group cooperated with the Ahfad al-Rasul Brigades to bomb Syrian military compounds in Damascus in August 2012. It also played a role in the Battle of Aleppo and collaborated with several other Salafist groups including al-Qaeda's al-Nusra Front and the Islamic Front. Ansar al-Islam remained functioning when many high-ranking members joined ISIS.

In 2016, they fought alongside the al-Nusra Front during a major offensive in the city. A military commander of the group, Abu Layth al-Tunisi, was reportedly killed in combat during this operation, likely in southwest Aleppo. By July 2018, the Syrian faction of Ansar al-Islam (not to be confused with the Syrian Ansar al-Sham group, which fought in the same area) was active in Latakia Governorate, raiding local Syrian Army outposts. Following the Turkish-Russian agreement to demilitarize Idlib in September 2018, the Syrian branch of Ansar al-Islam joined the Rouse the Believers Operations Room with other al-Qaeda-linked groups to oppose any attempts to demilitarize northwestern Syria.

Reported re-emergence in Iraq

After the defeat of ISIL and the recapture of Tuz Khurmatu by Turkmen and Shiite Popular Mobilization Forces during the 2017 Iraqi–Kurdish conflict, the town and its surroundings came under almost daily rocket attacks by a militant faction that used a white flag with the blackhead of a lion. These "White Flags", led by Assi al-Qawali, reportedly consisted of Kurdish Islamist militants, ex-ISIL fighters, and Kurdistan Democratic Party supporters who claimed to be fighting to "liberate the Kurdish lands occupied by the Iran-backed Shia militias". Iraqi security and intelligence officials said that intelligence reports made it likely that this new group was a front organization of Ansar al-Islam, which reportedly still had hundreds of fighters operating in the Hamrin Mountains.

On 30 October 2019, Ansar al-Islam claimed responsibility for an IED attack on a Popular Mobilization Forces vehicle in the Diyala Governorate in northeastern Iraq.

Alleged ties to Saddam Hussein's regime
In a "Special Analysis" report from July 31, 2002, the U.S. Defense Intelligence Agency (DIA) concluded the following regarding possible connections between Saddam's regime and Ansar al-Islam: "The Iraqi regime seeks to influence and manipulate political events in the Kurdish-controlled north and probably has some type of assets in contact with Ansar al-Islam, either through liaison or through penetration by an intelligence asset."

In January 2003, the U.S. alleged that Ansar al-Islam provided a possible link between Saddam Hussein and al-Qaeda, and said to prepare to unveil new evidence of it. Ansar al-Islam's leader, Mullah Krekar, in January 2003, denied all allegations of links of Ansar al-Islam with Saddam Hussein's government. Terrorism expert Rohan Gunaratna, in January 2003, agreed with Krekar that there was zero proof of links between Ansar al-Islam and Saddam Hussein's government.

In February 2003, then-United States Secretary of State, Colin Powell, told the United Nations Security Council that "Baghdad has an agent in the most senior levels of the radical organization, Ansar al-Islam, that controls this corner of Iraq. In 2000 this agent offered al-Qaeda a safe haven in the region. After we swept al-Qaeda from Afghanistan, some of its members accepted this safe haven."

In March–April 2003, BBC reported that a captured Iraqi intelligence officer had indicated that a senior Ansar al-Islam leader, Abu Wail, was a former Iraqi intelligence officer. "If that was true, then Saddam's regime had some influence on Ansar al-Islam, Saddam's interest could have been to have Ansar al-Islam as a force directly opposing Kurdish independence in northern Iraq", said BBC. Although that claim was proven wrong, due to the fact that Ansar al-Islam themself declared an independent emirate, from both Iraq and Kurdistan, and their leader supported Kurdish independence and was only against the Kurdish parties, due to their secularism.

In January 2004, Colin Powell acknowledged that his claims about Ansar al-Islam's alleged ties to Saddam Hussein had no reliable evidence; he told reporters at a State Department press conference that "I have not seen smoking gun, concrete evidence about the connection, but I do believe the connections existed."

The Senate Report on Pre-war Intelligence on Iraq, issued in 2004, concluded that Saddam Hussein was aware of Ansar al-Islam and al-Qaeda's presence in northeastern Iraq, and that he considered the groups a threat to his regime and the intelligence collection operations which his regime attempted against them. The Defense Intelligence Agency stated that senior Ansar al-Islam detainees revealed that the group viewed Saddam's regime as apostates, and denied any relationship with them.

The U.S. Select Committee on Intelligence in September 2006 confirmed that: "Post-war information reveals that Iraq viewed Ansar al-Islam as a threat to the regime and attempted to collect intelligence on the group".

After Powell had left office, in an interview, he told Barbara Walters that he considered his claims of ties between Saddam Hussein and Ansar al-Islam made a "blot" on his record, and that he felt "terrible" about the claims that he made which turned out to be false. He said, "There were some people in the intelligence community who knew at that time that some of these sources were not good and shouldn't be relied upon, and they didn't speak up. That devastated me." When asked specifically about a Saddam–al-Qaeda connection, Powell responded, "I have never seen a connection. I can't think otherwise because I'd never seen evidence to suggest there was one."

Swedish fund-raising case
Ali Berzengi and Ferman Abdullah, the owner of a falafel stand in Stockholm, raised money for what they claimed was poor children and Muslims. The money was then transferred through Abdullah's food stand, using the hawala transfer system. The Swedish Security Service was informed in 2002 that people in Sweden had transferred money to Ansar al-Islam. On April 19, 2004, Berzengi and Abdullah were arrested along with another Kurd from Iraq, Shaho Shahab, and Lebanese-born Bilal Ramadan. Ramadan was released in September after a court found that there wasn't enough evidence to keep him in custody. Shahab was released in December after the government decided to deport him to Iraq. However, since Shahab risked the death penalty in Iraq, the deportation was not carried out. In Abdullah's apartment, the police found a letter from a man who claimed to have contact with Abu Musab al-Zarqawi, the leader of al-Qaeda in Iraq, as well as a detailed manual on how to understand coded language.

On May 12, 2005, Abdullah and Berzengi were convicted of "planning of terrorist offences" and "planning of public devastation" by the Stockholm District Court. The Stockholm District Court said that Abdullah and Berzengi had transferred approximately one million SEK to Ansar al-Islam. According to the court there was strong evidence that the collected money had the specific purpose of financing terrorist attacks. Much of the evidence presented consisted of secret wire-tappings from U.S. and German intelligence sources. In the recordings, Abdullah and Berzengi used coded language to describe the attacks. Berzengi, who according to the court, was the mastermind, was sentenced to seven years of imprisonment, and Abdullah was sentenced to six years. The Svea Court of Appeal later reduced the sentences to five years for Berzengi, and four and a half years for Abdullah. The appeal to the Supreme Court was denied. They both are to be deported to Iraq after serving their sentences in Sweden. Abdullah is currently serving his sentence at the Norrköping Prison.

Berzengi and Abdullah's conviction was the first conviction since the new Swedish terrorism legislation was taken into effect on July 1, 2003. It was also the first ever conviction in Western Europe of people financing terrorism.

Links to al-Qaeda
One of Ansar al-Islam's leaders, Abu Abdullah al-Shafi'i, was trained by al-Qaeda during his stay in Afghanistan. Another early leading figure of Ansar al-Islam, Abu Abd al-Rahman, who was killed in October 2001, was convicted by the U.S. of ties to al-Qaeda. In a report dated July 31, 2002, the U.S. Defense Intelligence Agency concluded that "Ansar al-Islam is an independent organization that receives assistance from al-Qaeda, but is not a branch of the group."

In early 2003, less than 10 percent of individuals in Ansar al-Islam were both Taliban and al-Qaeda members. This, and the information about Shafi'i and Abd al-Rahman, led Colin Powell in January 2003 to claim that ties between Ansar al-Islam and al-Qaeda exist, and that the U.S. was preparing to unveil new evidence of it.

Mullah Krekar in January 2003 denied links of Ansar with al-Qaeda. U.S. terrorism expert Rohan Gunaratna, who supported Krekar against the claims that Ansar al-Islam had ties to Saddam Hussein, confirmed that Ansar al-Islam had ties to al-Qaeda. "Ansar al-Islam has links with al-Qaeda. In fact, it is an associate group of al-Qaeda". In March–April 2003, Mullah Krekar again protested against such links, and said to newspaper Al-Hayat that he had contacts with the American government prior to 11 September 2001, and possessed "irrefutable evidence against the Americans" and that he was "prepared to release it" if the U.S. made more claims of him being "linked to terrorism".

Designation as a terrorist organization

Leadership
Ansar al-Islam's first leader was Abu Abdullah al-Shafi'i, until shortly after 11 September 2001.

Mullah Krekar in 2001 replaced Shafi'i as leader of Ansar al-Islam, and Shafi'i became his deputy.

On December 15, 2011 Ansar al-Islam announced a new leader, Abu Hashim al Ibrahim. A post about the group was published on Twitter in November 2015, by Abu al-Waleed al-Salafi, stated that "a number of leaders of the group, including Abu Hashim Al Ibrahim, the emir of the group, were arrested in early 2014"; the article does not mention a new leader.

Claimed and alleged attacks
On February 18, 2001, four Kurdish Ansar al-Islam members assassinated Franso Hariri while he was on his way to work. Two previous attempts had been made on his life in Erbil in 1994 and 1997 at the same place and the same street, but he escaped from both.

In March 22, 2003, Ansar al-Islam detonated a car bomb, killing Australian journalist Paul Moran and several others. The group was also accused of the attempted bombing of a United States Department of Defense office in Erbil, in September 9, 2003, which killed three people.

On February 1, 2004 suicide bombings hit parallel Eid-celebrations arranged by the two main Kurdish parties, PUK and KDP, in the Kurdish capital of Erbil, killing 109 and wounding more than 200 celebrators. Ansar al-Sunnah claimed responsibility, and stated that the motive was to support "our brothers in Ansar al-Islam".

In November 2008, an archbishop in Mosul received a threat signed by the "Ansar al-Islam brigades", warning all Christians to leave Iraq or else be killed.

Another attack was the stabbing of a police officer in Berlin on September 17, 2015, by Ansar al-Islam operative Rafik Yousef.

See also
 Islamic Movement in Kurdistan
 Islamic Union of Kurdistan
 Islamic Group of Kurdistan
 Islamic Kurdish League
 Jamaat Ansar al-Sunna
 Kurdish Revolutionary Hezbollah
 Partiya İslamiya Kurdistan
 Kurdish Hezbollah
 Islamic Kurdish Society
 Islamic Fayli Grouping in Iraq
 List of armed groups in the Iraqi Civil War
 Al-Nusra Front
 Islamic State
 Rawti Shax

Further reading
 Micah Zenko (2009) Foregoing Limited Force: The George W. Bush Administration's Decision Not to Attack Ansar Al-Islam, Journal of Strategic Studies, 32:4, 615-649

References

External links
 The Rise and Fall of Ansar al-Islam, Christian Science Monitor
 Ansar al-Islam terrorist attacks
 Human Rights Watch: Ansar al-Islam in Iraqi Kurdistan
 Radical Islam in Iraqi Kurdistan: Ansar al-Islam
 Zarqawi and the 'al-Qaeda link', February 5, 2003.
 Mullah Krekar arrested( ), March 21, 2003.
 Ansar al-Islam: Postmortem or Prelude to More Attacks?, April 3, 2003.
 Time.com article on first AI suicide attack, February 26, 2003
 Ansar al-Islam: Iraq's al-Qaeda Connection, January 15, 2003
 State Department Designation of Ansar Al-Islam, February 20, 2003
 Foreign Terrorist Organizations: Designation of Ansar al-Islam (Al), Redesignation of Three Others (State Department), March 22, 2004
 Athena Intelligence Advanced Research Network on Insurgency and Terrorism
 The Great Terror, The New Yorker
 The Unknown: The C.I.A. and the Pentagon take another look at Al Qaeda and Iraq, The New Yorker
 Mullah Krekar Interview

Iraqi insurgency (2003–2011)
Organisations designated as terrorist by Japan
Organisations designated as terrorist by the United Kingdom
Organizations designated as terrorist by the United States
Organizations designated as terrorist by the United Arab Emirates
Organizations designated as terrorist by Israel
Organizations designated as terrorist by Bahrain
Organizations designated as terrorist by Canada
Organisations designated as terrorist by Australia
Organizations based in Asia designated as terrorist
Groups affiliated with al-Qaeda
Salafi Jihadist groups
Qutbist organisations
Anti-government factions of the Syrian civil war
Factions in the Iraq War
2001 establishments in Iraq
Jihadist groups in Iraq
Jihadist groups in Syria
Paramilitary organizations based in Iraq
Organizations designated as terrorist by Iraq
Kurdish Islamic organisations
Kurdish Islamism